Kani Khanjar (also Romanized as Kānī Khanjar) is a village in Khaneh Shur Rural District, in the Central District of Salas-e Babajani County, Kermanshah Province, Iran. At the 2006 census, its population was 150, in 33 families.

References 

Populated places in Salas-e Babajani County